The UNC Eshelman School of Pharmacy is located at the University of North Carolina at Chapel Hill, and includes a satellite campus at UNC Asheville. The Asheville School of Pharmacy campus opened in 2011, and graduated its first class in 2015.

U.S. News & World Report ranked the Eshelman School the #1 pharmacy school in the United States in 2016, 2020, 2021, and 2022.

The school is named after alumni Dr. Fred Eshelman who had donated nearly $140 million to the school.

It offers a Doctor of Pharmacy degree, a Master of Science in Pharmaceutical Sciences with a specialization in health system pharmacy administration, and a PhD in Pharmaceutical Sciences with an emphasis in four research areas.

Robert A. Blouin was the Dean of the school from 2003 to 2017, until he became the school's Provost in 2017. Dr. Dhiren Thakker was appointed interim dean, and turned the position over to Dr. Angela Kashuba when she became the college's first woman Dean since the inception of the historic school.

References

External links

Pharmacy schools in North Carolina
Pharmacy schools in the United States
Pharmacy
Educational institutions established in 1897
1897 establishments in North Carolina